= János Tomka =

Hungarian footballer (born 1967)

Personal information
- Date of birth: 31 January 1967 (age 59)
- Place of birth: Hungary
- Height: 1.80 m (5 ft 11 in)
- Position: Defender

Senior career*
Years	Team	Apps	(Gls)
1985–1991	Pécsi MFC	43	(1)
1991–1996	Újpest	99	(3)
1996–1997	Pécsi MFC	21	(0)
1998	Hapoel Ashkelon		
2000–2003	Pécsi MFC		
- * Club domestic league appearances and goals

János Tomka (born 31 January 1967) is a Hungarian former professional footballer who played as a defender.

== Early life ==
Tomka was born in 1967 in Hungary. He is a native of Pecs, Hungary.

== Playing career ==
Tomka started his career with Hungarian side Pécsi MFC. In 1991, he signed for Hungarian side Újpest. In 1996, he returned to Hungarian side Pécsi MFC. In 1998, he signed for Israeli side Hapoel Ashkelon. In 2000, he returned to Hungarian side Pécsi MFC for the second time.

== Post-playing career ==
After retiring from professional football, Tomka worked as a youth manager. He obtained a UEFA B License.

== Personal life ==
Tomka has been married, having met his wife at the age of 19.
